Ishq Gumshuda is an Urdu language Pakistani telenovela which was first broadcast in Pakistan in 2010 by Hum TV, premiering on 25 June 2010. Directed by Haissam Hussain and written by Noor-ul-Hada Shah, Ishq Gumshuda, which ended its run after telecasting 17 episodes, has been produced by Momina Duraid.

Plot 
Ali and Alize are best friends. They have a common friend named Neha. One day Ali's mother suggests to Ali that he should marry Alizeh, to which he happily agrees. Ali shares this with Neha but doesn't reveal it to her, whom his mother has suggested he marry. When Alizeh gets to know this, she gets annoyed. Alizeh gets disturbed and starts avoiding Ali for the next few days. When confronted by Ali at the office one day, she shouts at him and asks him how marriage can come between their friendship.

Ali proposes to Neha for marriage. When Alizeh finds out about the proposal, she becomes ecstatic and actively participates in the preparations for the wedding. Neha tells Ali that she always loved him and agrees to marry him. Ali unwillingly marries her. On the wedding night, he confronts Alizeh and asks her to marry him, but she refuses again.

Neha and Ali are now living a happy married life together, but Alizeh starts hiding herself and her feelings from others. She begins to stay out of home for long hours, comes back home late and even experiences depression. Alizeh befriends a man named Farooq Saad, who is of the age of her father and is the husband of a woman named Parizaad, who is suffering from a mental disorder. Alizeh's new friendship disturbs her mother and father. 

Determined to show Ali that she can make other friends than him, a jealous Alizeh, who now hides that she repents not marrying Ali, decides to marry Farooq Saad. When Ali learns this, he gets disturbed and informs Neha about it.

Neha tells Alizeh that she is not happy with Ali and asks her to take Ali from him. She also warns Alizeh that she won't let her marry a man of that age and destroy her life. Neha asks Ali to choose between her and Alizeh.

Alizeh meets Farooq Saad and asks him to marry her. Farooq tells Alizeh that he and Alizeh's mother had once loved each other during their younger days. He further informs her that he and Parizaad are leaving for their home in Iran soon. A disheartened Alizeh comes to Ali's home that night and confesses over a cup of coffee that she had always loved him. Alizeh decides to leave for London while Neha and Ali move on with their married life.

Cast 
 Sarwat Gilani as Alizeh
 Humayun Saeed as Ali
 Aamina Sheikh as Neha
 Samina Peerzada as Parizaad
 Javed Sheikh as Farooq Saad
 Hina Khawaja Bayat as Alizeh's mother
 Asif Raza Mir as Alizeh's father
 Shamim Hilaly as Ali's mother
 Lubna Aslam as Neha's mother

International broadcast and release 
 It was broadcast in India by Zindagi premiering on 5 September 2014. It ended its run in India on 21 September 2014 and was re-aired by Zindagi later, beginning on 18 October 2014 and ending on 6 November 2014.

References

Urdu-language telenovelas
Pakistani telenovelas
2010 telenovelas
2010 Pakistani television series debuts
2010 Pakistani television series endings
Hum TV original programming
Zee Zindagi original programming